Diogo Miguel Zambujo Pimentel (born 16 July 1997) is a footballer who plays as a midfielder for UNA Strassen. Born in Portugal, he has represented Luxembourg internationally.

Club career
Pimentel started his career with Luxembourgian third tier side Jeunesse Schieren. In 2016, he signed for Etzella in the Luxembourgian second tier, helping them earn promotion to the Luxembourgian top flight. In 2020, Pimentel signed for Luxembourgian top flight club Fola, helping them win the league.

Before the second half of 2021–22, he was sent on loan to Jammerbugt in Denmark.

International career
On 25 September 2022, he made his senior debut for the Luxembourg, coming off the bench in a 1–0 2022–23 UEFA Nations League victory over Lithuania.

References

External links
 
 

1997 births
Living people
Luxembourgian footballers
Luxembourg international footballers
Portuguese footballers
Portuguese emigrants to Luxembourg
Luxembourgian people of Portuguese descent
Association football midfielders
CS Fola Esch players
Danish 2nd Division players
Expatriate men's footballers in Denmark
FC Etzella Ettelbruck players
Jammerbugt FC players
Luxembourg Division of Honour players
Luxembourg National Division players
Luxembourgian expatriate footballers